World Enough and Time is a phrase from the poem "To His Coy Mistress" by Andrew Marvell, published in 1681, which has been used in the title of various other works:

Literature 
 World Enough and Time, a 1950 novel by Robert Penn Warren
 The Memoirs of Aga Khan: World Enough and Time, the 1954 autobiography of Sir Sultan Muhammed Shah, Aga Khan III
 World Enough, and Time, a 1980 novel by James Kahn
 "#ifdefDEBUG + 'world/enough' + 'time'", a short story by Terry Pratchett in the 1982 anthology A Blink of the Screen
 Worlds Enough and Time, 1992 novel by Joe Haldeman
 World Enough and Time: The Life of Andrew Marvell, a 1999 biography of the poet Andrew Marvell by Nicholas Murray
 Worlds Enough & Time, a 2002 novella collection by Dan Simmons

Film and Television 
 "World Enough and Time" (Star Trek: New Voyages), an episode of Star Trek: New Voyages
 "World Enough and Time" (Doctor Who), an episode of the tenth series of Doctor Who
 "World Enough and Time", an episode of the second series of The Diary of River Song audio drama

See also
 Had We But World Enough, a 1950 Australian play by Oriel Gray
 "Had We But World Enough", a 1940 short story by Shirley Jackson
 The World Is Not Enough (disambiguation)